The 2003 Yonex All England Open was the 93rd edition of the All England Open Badminton Championships. It was held from 11 to 16 February 2003, in Birmingham, England.

It was a four star tournament and the prize money was US$125,000.

Venue
National Indoor Arena

Final results

Men's singles

Section 1

Section 2

Women's singles

Section 1

Section 2

References

External links
Results 2003 All England Open

All England Open Badminton Championships
All England Open
All England Open
Sports competitions in Birmingham, West Midlands
March 2003 sports events in the United Kingdom